Neptune was discovered in 1846 and has only made occasional appearances in fiction since then. The first time it was mentioned, then called "Leverrier's planet", was in the 1848 novel The Triumphs of Woman by Charles Rowcroft where an inhabitant of the planet visits Earth. The earliest stories where Neptune itself directly appears as a setting, such as the 1930s works "The Monsters of Neptune" by Henrik Dahl Juve and Last and First Men by Olaf Stapledon, portray it as a rocky planet rather than as having its actual gaseous composition; in the latter, it becomes humanity's refuge in the far future when the Sun expands. Later works rectified this error, with Alexei Panshin's 1969 short story "One Sunday in Neptune" depicting a voyage into Neptune's atmosphere and Alex Irvine's 2003 story "Shepherded by Galatea" featuring resource extraction in the atmosphere. In the 1969 novel Macroscope by Piers Anthony, Neptune is converted to a world ship.

Neptune's largest moon Triton was discovered less than a month after the planet. A few works in the 1930s depicted humans going to Triton, looking for minerals in Roman Frederick Starzl's "The Power Satellite" and a permanent home in John R. Pierce's "The Relics from the Earth". In the late 20th century it started receiving more attention from science fiction writers than Neptune itself. The main such work is Samuel R. Delany's 1976 novel Triton (also known as Trouble on Triton: An Ambiguous Heterotopia) which depicts future societies living there. In the 1994 novel Neptune Crossing by Jeffrey Carver, an alien on Triton helps humanity avert an impact event.

References

 
 
Fiction about ice giants